Liberty (also known as Ingrams) is an unincorporated community in Harrisburg Township, Saline County, Illinois, United States. Liberty is located on County Route 37 along the southwestern border of Harrisburg.

Was a smaller rural community to the far southwest of Harrisburg along Liberty Road. It includes the Liberty Church and cemetery. In 1873, designer of the Cairo and Vincennes Railroad, Green Berry Raum of Harrisburg, Opened a slope mine on the south side of the rails near liberty. It became the first in the county to ship coal by rail-car. The Mine was called the Ledford Slope, and the spot was called Liberty Crossing. Liberty holds the new Junior High building.

James Alexander Harris along with John Pankey, James P. Yandell, and John X. Cain, donated land for the first additions of the town to a special committee at Liberty Baptist Church in 1852, after complaints that the county seat should be centralized in the county. The city of Harrisburg, Illinois was soon founded.

References

Unincorporated communities in Saline County, Illinois
Unincorporated communities in Illinois
Populated places established in 1873